The Ontario Junior Lacrosse League (OJLL) is considered the most competitive Junior A men's box lacrosse league in the world and the number one source for talent for the National Lacrosse League (NLL). The OJLL is sanctioned by the Ontario Lacrosse Association. It is an 11 team league wherein the top 8 go to the playoffs and battle it out for top spot in Ontario. The Ontario Champion is annually awarded the Iroquois Trophy and moves on to compete against teams from Alberta and British Columbia for the Minto Cup - the Junior A National Box Lacrosse Championship of Canada. Ontario has captured the Minto Cup fifty-six times since 1937. 

The OJLL is the number one source for talent for the National Lacrosse League (NLL), the largest and most successful professional lacrosse property in the world. Since the first NLL draft in 1996, sixteen OJLL alumni have been selected first overall.

The Teams

2021 OJLL Playoffs Bracket - Iroquois Trophy

The Iroquois Trophy playoff champions
Champion moves on to the Minto Cup national championship.

Draft History

2018 Midget Draft

2017 Midget Draft

2016 Midget Draft

2015 Midget Draft

2014 Midget Draft

Former Member Teams
  Akwesasne Indians (Folded in 2012)
Elora Mohawks
Hamilton Bengals
Huntsville Hawks
Mississauga Tomahawks (Relocated to Mimico in 2015)
Orillia Rama Kings
Oshawa Green Gaels
Ottawa Titans
Rexdale Warriors
Scarborough Saints
Sarnia Pacers
Toronto Beaches
  Windsor Warlocks

References

External links

Ontario Lacrosse Association
Lacrosse leagues in Canada
Sports leagues established in 1933
1933 establishments in Ontario